The following Swaminarayan temples are located in the area of Chicago, Illinois:

 Shri Swaminarayan Mandir, Chicago (Itasca), in Itasca, Illinois
 Shri Swaminarayan Mandir, Chicago (Wheeling), in Wheeling, Illinois

Swaminarayan temples